Brice Phillips is an amateur radio operator (KB5MPW) in Hancock County, Mississippi. He operates WQRZ-LP, a low-powered FM station. He gained national media attention for his efforts during the Hurricane Katrina disaster, both in warning people to evacuate and in directing survivors to relief centers. Bill Moyers, in his television show Moyers on America, used Mr. Phillips' example to highlight the importance of media diversity (and the dangers of media consolidation).

References

1966 births
Living people
Amateur radio people